E4300 may refer to:
 Nikon Coolpix 4300, a digital camera by Nikon
 Intel Core 2 Duo E4300, a microprocessor